The Women's rhythmic individual all-around competition at the 2013 Mediterranean Games in Mersin, Turkey. The event will be held at the Mersin Gymnastics Hall on 29–30 June.

Competition format

The competition consisted of a qualification round and a final round. The top ten gymnasts in the qualification round advance to the final round. In each round, the gymnasts perform four routines (ball, hoop, clubs, and ribbon), with the scores added to give a total.

Schedule
All times are Eastern European Summer Time (UTC+3)

Qualification

Giulia di Luca of Italy finished in ninth position but did not qualify because a country can only enter two athletes in final.

Final

References

Gymnastics at the 2013 Mediterranean Games